Romesh C. Batra is a University Distinguished Professor and Clifton C. Garvin Professor of Engineering Science and Mechanics at Virginia Polytechnic Institute and State University (Virginia Tech), Blacksburg, Virginia. He was born in Village Dherowal (now in Pakistan), Punjab, India. His family migrated from Dherowal to Shahabad Markanda, Haryana, India after India became an independent country. Dr. Batra has authored the book, Elements of Continuum Mechanics, AIAA Educational Series. His research group has published in reputable refereed and widely read journals more than 460 papers of which about 40 are single-authored and nearly 320 have two authors; these are documented on the website: http://www.beam.vt.edu/batra.

Early life and education
He earned his B.Sc. (Mechanical Engineering), M.A. Sc. (Mechanical Engineering) and Ph.D. (Mechanics and Materials Science) degrees, respectively, in 1968, ’69 and ‘72 from Thapar University (India), University of Waterloo (Canada) and the Johns Hopkins University (USA).  His Ph.D. degree was under the tutelage of the eminent elastician, Professor J. L. Ericksen.  After a year of Post-doctoral experience with Professor Ericksen at the JHU and another year with Professor Mark Levinson at the McMaster University, Canada, he joined the Missouri University of Science and Technology (MUST), Rolla, USA as a visiting assistant professor in 1974 and was promoted to full professor in 1981.  He joined Virginia Tech as the Clifton C. Garvin Professor in 1994, and was honored as a University Distinguished Professor in 2019.

Teaching and research 
Dr. Batra has been teaching courses on the Finite Element Method, Continuum Mechanics and Nonlinear Elasticity to M.Sc. and Ph.D. students since 1974.  His lectures for the 1st graduate level course on Continuum Mechanics are available on youtube.com.  Nearly a dozen out of his 40 former Ph.D. students hold faculty positions in India, China, Chile, Taiwan, S. Korea, France, Canada and the USA. Several other former Ph.D. students hold leadership positions in civilian industries and research laboratories.

Graduate Student Mentoring: His Ph.D. students are listed on the website:  http://genealogy.math.ndsu.nodak.edu/id.php?id=105522

Research Areas: His research group has worked in several areas of applied mechanics such as adiabatic shear bands (these are narrow regions of intense plastic deformation that form during high strain-rate deformations of most metallic alloys and generally precede fracture), composite structures, functionally graded materials/structures, nanostructures, smart materials/structures, micro-electro-mechanical systems, and computational mechanics including the finite element and meshless methods.

Software Development: Dr. Batra’s group has developed software based on the finite element and meshless methods for analyzing contact problems for rubber-covered rolls, adiabatic shear bands, crack propagation in functionally graded materials, damage evolution in fiber-reinforced laminated composites, and transient deformations of structures made of thermo-elasto-visco-plastic materials and fiber-reinforced composites.

Professional Affiliations: He is an Honorary Member of the American Society of Mechanical Engineers (ASME), and a Fellow of the American Academy of Mechanics, American Society of Engineering Education, Society of Engineering Science, and the US Association of Computational Mechanics.  He is a founder and editor of the journal: Mathematics and Mechanics of Solids

Professional Service: He served for two 5-year terms on the National Research Council Panels to review and advise areas of research in the Warhead Mechanics and the Lethality/Survivability Directorates of the Army Research Laboratory, Aberdeen, MD, USA; for one year as President of the Society of Engineering Science; for 3 years as Secretary of the American Academy of Mechanics; and for 5 years as Chair of the ASME Elasticity Committee.

Recognitions: 
 As of 27 June 2021, his works have received more than 21,000 citations with an H-index of 76 on Google Scholar.  
 American Society of Mechanical Engineers Honorary Membership Award (one of 3 so honored in 2015 out of nearly 124,000 members; it’s the highest membership level in the ASME and recognizes recipient’s lifetime accomplishments) 
 Engineering Science Medal from the Society of Engineering Science (2009)  (The Medal is awarded in recognition of a singularly important contribution to Engineering Science)
Belytschko Medal (2019) from the US Association of Computational Mechanics for his work on adiabatic shear bands and MSPH/SSPH meshless methods 
 Virginia http://www.indiapost.com/two-indian-americans-receive-virginia-science-awards Outstanding Scientist Award (2011) (granted by the Commonwealth of Virginia, 2 scientists honored every year for their outstanding contributions to research)
 Virginia Outstanding Faculty Award (2010) (generally 2 faculty members from Research I universities are selected for this Award based on their superbly fulfilling the teaching, research and outreach mission of the university)
 Honorary D.Sc. from Thapar University (2006) [one of the three awarded till 2015)
 Alexander von Humboldt Award (1992) for senior scientists (The award is granted in recognition of a researcher's entire achievements to date to academics whose fundamental discoveries, new theories, or insights have had a significant impact on their own discipline and who are expected to continue producing cutting-edge achievements in the future) 
 Virginia Tech Alumni Award for Excellence in Graduate Advising

See also
 List of University of Waterloo people

References

Year of birth missing (living people)
Living people
Indian mechanical engineers
Virginia Tech faculty
University of Waterloo alumni
Johns Hopkins University alumni
Missouri University of Science and Technology faculty